Selce is a village and municipality in Banská Bystrica District in the Banská Bystrica Region of central Slovakia.

History
In historical records the village was first mentioned in 1332.

Geography
The municipality lies at an altitude of 421 metres and covers an area of 19.994 km². It has a population of about 2,175 people.

References

External links
 http://www.selce.sk/

Villages and municipalities in Banská Bystrica District